

Fractures
 Aviator's fracture
 Bankart's fracture
 Barton's fracture
 Bennett's fracture
 Boxer's fracture
 Bumper fracture
 Burst fracture
 Bosworth fracture
 Chance fracture
 Chopart's fracture-dislocation
 Clay-Shoveller fracture
 Colles' fracture
 Cotton's fracture
 Dupuytren's fracture
 Duverney fracture
 Essex-Lopresti fracture
 Galeazzi fracture
 Gosselin fracture
 Hangman's fracture
 Holstein–Lewis fracture
 Holdsworth fracture
 Hutchinson's fracture
 Hoffa fracture
 Hume fracture
 Jefferson fracture
 Jones fracture
 Lisfranc fracture
 March fracture
 Maisonneuve fracture
 Malgaigne's fracture
 Monteggia fracture
 Moore's fracture
Night-stick fracture
 Pilon fracture
 Pipkin fracture-dislocation
 Plafond fracture
 Pott's fracture
 Rolando fracture
 Segond fracture
 Shepherd's fracture
 Side-swipe fracture
 Smith's fracture
 Stieda fracture
 Straddle fracture
 Tillaux-Chaput avulsion fracture
 Wagstaffe-Le Fort avulsion fracture
 Volkmann avulsion fracture

Orthopedic classifications
 Bado classification
 Danis–Weber classification
 Denis classification
 Evans-Jensen classification
 Ficat classification
 Frykman classification
 Garden classification
 Gartland classification
 Gruen zone
 Gustilo open fracture classification
 Haruguchi classification
 Hawkin's classification
 Herbert classification
 Herscovici classification
 Ideberg classification
 Jupiter and Mehne classification
 Lauge-Hansen classification
 Le Fort fracture of skull
 Loder classification
 Mayfield classification
 Milch classification
 Neer classification
 Pipkin classification
 Pauwel's classification
 Riseborough and Radin classification
 Ruedi-Allgower classification
 Salter–Harris fracture
 Schatzker classification of tibia plateau fractures
 Tile classification
 Schatzker classification of olecranon fractures
 Sanders classification
 Seddon classification
 Seinsheimer classification
 Schenck classification
 Teisen classification
 Tscherne classification
 Thompson and Epstein classification
 Vancouver classification
 Wassel classification
 Winquist and Hansen classification
 Young-Burgess classification

Procedures

 Akin osteotomy
 Bankart repair
 Broström procedure
 Brunelli procedure
 Cotrel–Dubousset instrumentation
 Cunningham Shoulder Reduction
 Darrach's procedure
 Darrah procedure
 Evans technique
 Girdlestone's Procedure
 Keller procedure
 Kocher manoeuvre
 Krukenberg procedure
 Latarjet procedure
 Mumford procedure
 Ponseti method
 Swanson's Arthroplasty
 Tommy John surgery
 Weil's Osteotomy
 Weaver–Dunn procedure
 Zadek's procedure

Anatomy

 Gerdy's tubercle
 Guyon's Canal
 Harrison's groove
 Haversian canal
 Humphrey's ligament
 Lisfranc joint
 Lisfranc ligament
 Lister's tubercle
 Martin-Gruber Anastomosis
 Schmorl's nodes
 Volkmann's canals

CPRs

 Harris Hip Score
 Kocher criteria
 Mirel's Score
 Rowe Score

Clinical signs

 Andersson lesion
 Baastrup's sign
 Bouchard's nodes
 Boutonniere deformity
 Coopernail's sign
 Codman triangle
 Destot's sign
 Frankel's sign
 Heberden's node
 Kanavel's sign
 Larrey's sign
 Trendelenburg gait

Clinical examination

 Allis test
 Apley grind test
 Apley scratch test
 Barlow's maneuver
 Clarke's test
 Cozen's test
 Cotton test
 Durkan's test
 Finkelstein's test
 Froment's sign
 Jobe's test
 Kapandji score
 Gaenslen's test
 Galeazzi test
 Gerber's test
 Hawkins–Kennedy test
 Hubscher's maneuver
 Lachman test
 Lasègue's sign
 McMurray test
 Mulder's sign
 Neer impingement sign
 O'Brien's test
 Ober's test
 Ortolani test
 Patrick's test
 Phalen maneuver
 Simmonds' test
 Schober's test
 Speed's test
 Thomas test
 Thompson test
 Tinel sign
 Trendelenburg's sign
 Yergason's test
 Waddell's signs
 Watson's test
 Wilson test

Congenital conditions

 Albers-Schonberg disease
 Albright's hereditary osteodystrophy
 Antley–Bixler syndrome
 Apert syndrome
 Beals syndrome
 Bechterew's
 Bruck syndrome
 Camurati–Engelmann disease
 Catel–Manzke syndrome
 Cole carpenter syndrome
 Conradi–Hünermann syndrome
 Currarino syndrome
 Ehlers–Danlos syndrome
 Eiken syndrome
 Ellis–van Creveld syndrome
 Erlenmeyer flask deformity
 Fairbanks disease
 Hajdu–Cheney syndrome
 Jansen's metaphyseal chondrodysplasia
 Kashin–Beck disease
 Klippel–Feil syndrome
 Klippel–Trénaunay–Weber syndrome
 Kniest dysplasia
 Lobstein syndrome
 Madelung's deformity
 Maffucci syndrome
 Marfan syndrome
 Marie-Strümpell disease
 Marshall syndrome
 Marshall–Smith syndrome
 McCune–Albright syndrome
 Melnick–Needles syndrome
 Morton's toe
 Ollier disease
 Rett syndrome
 Rubinstein–Taybi syndrome
 Scheuermann's disease
 Schwartz–Jampel syndrome
 Silver–Russell syndrome
 Teunissen–Cremers syndrome
 Trevor disease
 Wiedemann syndrome

Acquired conditions

 Baker's cyst
 Bankart lesion
 Barré–Liéou syndrome
 Blount's disease
 Brodie abscess
 Chandler's disease
 De Quervain syndrome
 Dupuytren's contracture
 Ewing's sarcoma
 Freiberg disease
 Garre's sclerosing osteomyelitis
 Gorham's disease
 Haglund's deformity
 Hill–Sachs lesion
 Iselin's disease
 Kashin–Beck disease
 Kienbock's disease
 Köhler disease
 Legg–Calvé–Perthes syndrome
 Morton's neuroma
 O'Donoghue's triad
 Osgood–Schlatter disease
 Paget's disease of bone
 Panner disease
 Perthes Lesion
 Preiser disease
 Sever's disease
 Stener lesion
 Sudeck's atrophy
 Tietze syndrome
 Volkmann's contracture

Orthopedic implants

 Austin Moore prosthesis
 Baksi's prosthesis
 Charnley prosthesis
 Denis Browne bar
 Ender's nail
 Grosse-Kempf nail
 Harrington rod
 Herbert screw
 Kirschner wire
 Kuntscher nail
 Moore's pin
 Neer's prosthesis
 Rush nail
 Schanz screw
 Seidel nail
 Smith Peterson nail
 Steinmann pin
 Swanson prosthesis
 Talwalkar nail
 Thompson prosthesis

Orthopaedic instruments

 Bryant's traction
 Charnley Retractor
 Darrach elevator
 Faraboeuf forceps
 Gigli saw
 Hohmann retractor
 Ilizarov apparatus
 Inge retractor
 Jungbluth forceps
 Matta forceps
 Taylor Spatial Frame
 Thomas splint
 Verbrugge forceps
 Volkmann retractor
 Weber forceps

Surgical approaches

 Hardinge lateral approach to the hip
 Moore or Southern posterior approach to the hip
 Smith-Petersen anterior approach to the hip
 Watson-Jones anterolateral approach to the hip

Radiographic signs

 Baumann's angle
 Blumensaat's line
 Bohler's angle
 Cobb angle
 Fairbank's changes
 Gilula's Lines
 Harris lines
 Hilgenreiner's line
 Kellgren-Lawrence grading scale
 Klein's line
 Loosers zone
 Pauwel's angle
 Perkin's line
 Shenton's Line
 Southwick angle
 Thurstan Holland sign
 Trethowan's sign
 Terry Thomas sign

Radiographic projections

 Judet view
 Broden's view

Principles

 Wolff's law
 Hueter-Volkmann law
 Charley's principles of three-point fixation

Orthopaedic